You Saved My Life is an Australian factual television series that screened on the Nine Network in 2009. It was hosted by 60 Minutes reporter Tara Brown.

You Saved My Life follows the stories of people who have been rescued in an emergency and reunited with their rescuers. It has a similar premise to the successful Seven Network factual television series Triple Zero Heroes.

Nine Network original programming
2009 Australian television series debuts
2009 Australian television series endings
Australian factual television series